Flatliners is a 1990 American psychological horror film directed by Joel Schumacher, produced by Michael Douglas and Rick Bieber, and written by Peter Filardi. It stars Kiefer Sutherland, Julia Roberts, William Baldwin, Oliver Platt, and Kevin Bacon. The film is about five medical students who attempt to find out what lies beyond death by conducting clandestine experiments that produce near-death experiences. The film was shot on the campus of Loyola University (Chicago) between October 1989 and January 1990, and was nominated for an Academy Award for Best Sound Editing in 1990 (Charles L. Campbell and Richard C. Franklin). The film was theatrically released on August 10, 1990, by Columbia Pictures. It grossed $61 million at the box office.

A follow-up film directed by Danish filmmaker Niels Arden Oplev was released in September 2017, also featuring Sutherland in a starring role.

Plot

Medical student Nelson Wright walks onto a beach one day and proclaims “today is a good day to die”. He later convinces four of his classmates—Joe Hurley, David Labraccio, Rachel Manus, and Randy Steckle—to help him discover what lies beyond death. Nelson flatlines for one minute before his classmates resuscitate him. While "dead", he experiences a sort of afterlife. He sees a vision of a boy he bullied as a child, Billy Mahoney. He merely tells his friends that he cannot describe what he saw, but something is there. The others follow Nelson's daring feat.

Joe flatlines next, and he experiences an erotic afterlife sequence linked to his sexually promiscuous lifestyle. He agrees with Nelson's claim that something indeed exists. After arguing with Rachel and out-bidding her on the length of time that they are willing to remain “dead”, David is third to flatline on Halloween, and he sees a vision of a girl, Winnie Hicks, whom he bullied in grade school. The three men start to experience hallucinations related to their afterlife visions. Nelson gets physically assaulted by Billy Mahoney twice. Joe, engaged to be married, is haunted by the women that he surreptitiously videotaped during his sexual dalliances, the women taunting Joe with the same come-ons, lines and false promises he used on them. David is confronted by the 8-year-old Winnie Hicks on a train, and she verbally taunts him the way he taunted her.

Rachel decides to flatline next. David rushes in, intending to stop the others from giving Rachel their same fate, but she is already "dead" when he arrives. Rachel nearly dies permanently when the power goes out and the men are unable to shock her with the defibrillator paddles. She survives, but she too is haunted by the memory of her father committing suicide when she was young.

The three men finally reveal their harrowing experiences to one another, and David decides to put his visions to a stop. Meanwhile, Joe's fiancée, Anne, comes to his apartment and, having discovered his collection of videos, ends their relationship. Joe's visions cease after Anne leaves him.

David goes to visit a now adult Winnie Hicks and apologizes to her. Winnie accepts his apology and thanks him. David immediately feels a weight lifted off his shoulders. David then finds Nelson, who accompanied David to visit Winnie, beating himself with a climbing axe. In Nelson's mind, however, Billy is again attempting to beat him to death. David stops him, and they return to town. David later instructs Joe and Randy to help Nelson find Billy and that under no uncertain terms is Nelson to be left alone.

Having an idea of what Rachel has experienced, David offers to stay with Rachel and they make love. While Rachel and David are together, Nelson takes Randy and Joe to a graveyard. He reveals that he killed Billy as a kid by throwing rocks at him until he fell out of a tree. The two try to tell Nelson that what he did was not intentional, but Nelson makes a cryptic choice about making amends. Confused and worried they ask but Nelson in his furor storms off in Joe's Mustang, leaving him and Randy stranded.

David leaves Rachel alone in order to rescue Joe and Randy at the cemetery. While alone, Rachel goes to the bathroom and finds her father. He apologizes to his daughter and her guilt over his death is lifted when she discovers that he was addicted to morphine and that his suicide was related to post-traumatic stress disorder stemming from his service in the Vietnam War. Nelson calls Rachel, and he tells her that he needs to flatline again in order to make amends. He apologizes for involving her and their friends in his reckless plan. Rachel tries to tell Nelson that it doesn't matter, but Nelson counters with the belief that everything that they say and do matters.

The three men realize to their shock what he intends and race to stop Nelson, who has been dead for an estimated nine minutes already. Rachel soon finds them, and the four friends work feverishly to save Nelson. In the afterlife, Nelson is experiencing himself as a young boy being stoned by Billy from the tree. Nelson dies in the afterlife from the fall, and his friends cannot revive him. When they are about to give up, Billy forgives Nelson, and David gives Nelson one last shock. This brings him back, and Nelson tells them, "It wasn't such a good day to die."

Cast

 Kiefer Sutherland as Nelson Wright
 Aeryk Egan as Young Nelson
 Julia Roberts as Rachel Manus
 Kevin Bacon as David Labraccio
 John Joseph Duda as Young David 
 William Baldwin as Joe Hurley
 Oliver Platt as Randy Steckle
 Kimberly Scott as Winnie Hicks
 Kesha Reed as Young Winnie
 Joshua Rudoy as Billy Mahoney
 Benjamin Mouton as Jack Manus
 Hope Davis as Anne Coldren
 Patricia Belcher as Edna
 Beth Grant as Housewife

Release
Columbia Pictures released Flatliners theatrically on August 10, 1990.  The film debuted at number 1 at the US box office, grossing $10 million on its opening weekend.  It grossed $61.5 million total in the United States.

Reception
The review aggregator Rotten Tomatoes reports that 50% of critics give the film a positive review based on 54 reviews, with the critical consensus "While it boasts an impressive cast, striking visuals, and an effective mood, Flatliners never quite jolts its story to life." On Metacritic, which assigns a weighted average rating to reviews, the film has a score 55 out of 100, based on 10 critics, indicating "mixed or average reviews". Audiences polled by CinemaScore gave the film an average grade of "B+" on an A+ to F scale.

In her review for The New York Times, Caryn James wrote, "when taken on its own stylish terms, Flatliners is greatly entertaining. Viewers are likely to go along with this film instantly or else ridicule it to death. Its atmospheric approach doesn't admit much middle ground." Critic Roger Ebert praised the film as "an original, intelligent thriller, well-directed by Joel Schumacher" and called the cast "talented young actors, [who] inhabit the shadows with the right mixture of intensity, fear and cockiness". But Ebert criticized Flatliners for "plot manipulation that is unworthy of the brilliance of its theme. I only wish it had been restructured so we didn't need to go through the same crisis so many times." Similarly, Peter Travers of Rolling Stone magazine praised the film's young stars, but complained that "by dodging the questions it raises about life after death, Flatliners ends up tripping on timidity. It's a movie about daring that dares nothing."

Entertainment Weekly gave the film a "D" rating and Owen Gleiberman wrote, "What isn't in evidence is the sort of overheated lunacy that made the William Hurt speed-freak trip movie Altered States (1980) such delectable trash. Flatliners is camp, but of a very low order. Schumacher is too intent on pandering to the youth market to take the mad risks and plunges that make for a scintillating bad movie." In contrast, The Washington Posts Rita Kempley loved the film, calling it: "a heart-stopping, breathtakingly sumptuous haunted house of a movie". The film has become a cult film.

Soundtrack
 "Party Town" – Written and performed by Dave Stewart and the Spiritual Cowboys
 "The Clapping Song" – Written by Lincoln Chase

Follow-up

On October 5, 2015, a follow-up starring Elliot Page and Diego Luna was announced, following the casting of Nina Dobrev, James Norton and Kiersey Clemons. Kiefer Sutherland also appears in the remake. Sutherland had originally announced that he was reprising his role as Nelson Wright, revealing that the new film would actually be a sequel rather than a remake. However, upon release, Sutherland's character is identified as Barry Wolfson; a deleted scene indicates Sutherland is in fact playing the same character, living under a new identity. Directed by Danish filmmaker Niels Arden Oplev, it was released on September 29, 2017.

See also
 A Thousand Deaths

Notes

References

External links

 
 
 

1990 films
1990 drama films
1990 horror films
1990 science fiction films
1990 thriller films
1990s English-language films
1990s horror drama films
1990s psychological drama films
1990s psychological horror films
1990s psychological thriller films
1990s science fiction drama films
1990s science fiction horror films
1990s science fiction thriller films
1990s thriller drama films
American horror drama films
American psychological drama films
American psychological horror films
American psychological thriller films
American science fiction drama films
American science fiction horror films
American science fiction thriller films
American supernatural drama films
American supernatural horror films
American supernatural thriller films
American thriller drama films
Columbia Pictures films
Fiction about near-death experiences
Films about bullying
Films about Christianity
Films about death
Films directed by Joel Schumacher
Films produced by Michael Douglas
Films scored by James Newton Howard
Films set in Chicago
Films set in universities and colleges
Films shot in Chicago
Medical-themed films
1990s American films